Swiss Chileans are Chilean citizens of Swiss ancestry. There are currently 15,000 Swiss citizens residing in Chile, with approximately 90,000 descendants of the 19th century immigrants.

Immigration to Chile 

Due to confusion with that of German, Italian, and French immigrants, the actual number of Swiss Chileans varies from one source to another.  In 1881, 28 years after colonization by Germans in southern Chile, special agencies were authorized to recruit Swiss emigrants. These arrived in three key periods:

Between April 1876 and May 1877, a contingent received government land grants consisting of hectares of forest, woodland, and scrub land in the Magallanes Region (Agua Fresca, next to Punta Arenas). These farmers proceeded to transform the region into agricultural lands suitable for pasture and crop farming.

In 1880, Don Francisco De B. Echeverría was appointed to lead the Agency for Colonization and Immigration. Agent General Benjamin Davila Larrain was entrusted with the recruitment of settlers.

Following the end of resistance to occupation by indigenous Mapuche in the 1880s, large areas of land were advertised to European settlers, many of whom were experiencing economic hardship. The Chilean government invited Swiss emigrants on the condition they settle in Araucanía, to cultivate it and create arable land for crops and livestock. The first contingent departed in November 1883; their success would direct future emigration authorizations. Land grants were awarded to an estimated 8,000+ families . 

The preparation of the convoys meant the operation of a real network. Shipping companies, especially the English "Company of the Pacific", ensured the French port of Bordeaux as a regular line which had the steamships Valparaíso Cotopaxi, Potosi, Sorata, The Valparaíso, Aconcagua and Britain, among others, as the main boats that sailed Swiss settlers.

Mass immigration 

The first large group of immigrants composed of 1,311 families landed in Valparaíso on 19 December 1883. Between 1883 and 1886 they were shipped to the territory of Araucanía; 12,602 Swiss, representing 7% of emigration Switzerland overseas. The operations continued to evolve until 1890, when 22,708 Swiss were spread over the 31 colonies in the heart of the Araucania; 72.7% of emigrants settled in the 7 most important colonies of the time: Victoria, Traiguén, Faja Maisan, Temuco, Quino, Galvarino, Ercilla, and Pitrufquen.

The last recorded mass exodus of Swiss to Chile, during 1915 to 1950, recorded 30,000 residents installed in the central region, primarily in Santiago and Valparaíso.

Notable Chileans of Swiss descent
Hernán Büchi, economist, politician
Jean Philippe Cretton, TV presenter, musician
Karen Doggenweiler, journalist, TV hostess
Kristel Köbrich Schimpl, swimmer
Stefan Kramer, actor, comedian
Eduardo Frei Montalva, President of Chile (1964–1970)
Eduardo Frei Ruiz-Tagle, President of Chile (1994–2000)
Fernando Matthei, former Commander in Chief of the Chilean Air force 
Evelyn Matthei, minister
Felipe Seymour, football (soccer) player
Ingrid Wildi Merino, video artist

See also
Basque Chilean
Greeks in Chile
British Chilean
German Chilean
French Chilean
Italian Chilean

References

Chile
European Chilean
 
Chile–Switzerland relations